Richie Allan (born 16 April 1975) is an Australian former professional rugby league footballer who played for the Sydney City Roosters and the Gold Coast Chargers.

Allan, an Indigenous Australian from Walhallow, played as a half-back, five-eighth and fullback. From 1994 to 1997 he played first-grade for the Roosters, then in 1998 spent a year on the Gold Coast, in what was the Chargers' final league season. He played in the local Canberra competition for several seasons after leaving the NRL.

References

External links
Richie Allan at Rugby League project

1975 births
Living people
Australian rugby league players
Sydney Roosters players
Gold Coast Chargers players
Indigenous Australian rugby league players
Rugby league halfbacks
Rugby league five-eighths
Rugby league players from New South Wales